Spooks (known as MI-5 in certain countries) is a British spy drama television series, created by David Wolstencroft. It debuted on BBC One on 13 May 2002. The series follows the activities of the intelligence officers of Section D in MI5. In 2003 it won the British Academy Television Award for Best Drama Series.

From its debut until its finale on 23 October 2011, 86 episodes were aired across ten complete series. The first series has six episodes, and series two through six have 10 episodes each. Series seven through nine have eight episodes each. The ninth series aired between September and November 2010. The tenth and final series, which began airing on 18 September 2011, consists of six episodes. The individual episodes have no official titles, though there are internal working titles. The USA versions air with titles, which sometimes, but not always, match the working titles.

Series overview

Episodes

Series 1 (2002)

Series 2 (2003)

Series 3 (2004)

Series 4 (2005)

Series 5 (2006)

Series 6 (2007)

Series 7 (2008)

Series 8 (2009)

Series 9 (2010)

Series 10 (2011)

Ratings

Home video releases

Notes

References

Spooks (TV series)
 
Spooks
Spooks